Fables is an album by French jazz fusion artist Jean-Luc Ponty, released in 1985.

Reception

AllMusic's Richard S. Ginell noted that Ponty's "has opened up considerably", but that he "continues to explore the high-tech, electronic, sequenced ostinato world that he opened the door to on Individual Choice" and that the album is "very even... without any extreme peaks or dips".

Track listing 
All songs by Jean-Luc Ponty. Adapted from liner notes.

Personnel 
 Jean-Luc Ponty – Zeta & Barcus-Berry electric violins, Prophet-5 & Synclavier synthesizers, electronic percussion, vocals
 Scott Henderson – electric guitar (tracks 1-5)
 Allan Holdsworth - electric guitar solo on Cat Tales
 Baron Browne – electric bass (tracks 1-5)
 Rayford Griffin – drums, percussion (tracks 1-5)

Production
 Jean-Luc Ponty – producer
 David Ahlert – engineer
 David Eaton – engineer
 Dan Garcia – engineer
 Cliff Jones – engineer
 Peter R. Kelsey – engineer

Charts

References

External links 
 Jean-Luc Ponty - Fables at Discogs
 Jean-Luc Ponty - Fables at ProgArchives.com

1985 albums
Jean-Luc Ponty albums
Atlantic Records albums